Pec may refer to:

 Peć, a city in Kosovo also known as Peja
 Peć Bistrica, a river in Kosovo
 Pec (Domažlice District), a village in the Czech Republic
 Peč, a village in the Czech Republic
 Pec pod Sněžkou, a small town in the Czech Republic
 Pectoralis major muscle, a chest muscle

See also
 PEC (disambiguation)
 Pecs (disambiguation)